Robert Kenneth Heinz (born July 25, 1947) is a former defensive tackle in American college and professional football. He was drafted in the 2nd round (37th pick overall) of the 1969 NFL Draft by the Miami Dolphins, and played professionally for the Miami Dolphins and the Washington Redskins.

Biography
Heinz was born in Milwaukee, Wisconsin and attended Messmer High School in Milwaukee and Lincoln High School in Stockton, California. He played college football at San Joaquin Delta College and the University of the Pacific. Heinz was inducted into the University of the Pacific Hall of Fame as a 1987-1988 Inductee.

He played for the Miami Dolphins from 1969 to 1977 and for the Washington Redskins in 1978. He is a member of the undefeated (17–0) 1972 Miami Dolphins.

After retiring from the NFL, Heinz became an advertising executive in Palo Alto, California.

See also
Other American Football League players

References

External links 
 All Michigan: Bay City All-Stars brought passion and flair to football en route to Bay County Sports Hall of Fame

1947 births
Living people
Miami Dolphins players
Washington Redskins players
Pacific Tigers football players
Delta College Mustangs football players
Players of American football from Milwaukee
American Football League players